Nettenchelys bellottii is a species of duckbill eel in the family Nettastomatidae. It is found in the western Indian Ocean and the Red Sea. This species is only known from larvae.

References

Nettastomatidae
Fish described in 1928